Novorossiya TV is a Russian-speaking TV channel which has is operated since 2014, under the supervision of the self-proclaimed Donetsk People's Republic.

The channel is banned in Ukraine due to its perceived pro-Russian bias.

References 

Mass media in Donetsk
Russian-language television stations
Television in the Donetsk People's Republic
Television channels and stations established in 2014
Censored works